The Queen Elizabeth II Challenge Cup Stakes is a Grade I American thoroughbred horse race for three-year-old fillies over a distance of one and one-eighth miles on the turf held annually in October at Keeneland Race Course in Lexington, Kentucky during the fall meeting.

History
The race was inaugurated on October 11, 1984, in honour of the British monarch, Queen Elizabeth II, who attended the Keeneland races, during her private visit to Central Kentucky, and who presented a trophy on that date. The event was held on the dirt track over a distance of  miles with Sintra winning in a time of 1:43.

The following year the event was moved to the turf track. 

The Queen Elizabeth II Challenge Cup was a Listed race in 1984 and 1985, and was upgraded to Grade III status in 1986. The event held this status for two runnings and was upgraded to Grade II. In 1991 was upgraded once more to Grade I.

It is an important prep race to the Breeders' Cup Filly & Mare Turf.

Records
Time record: 
 miles: 1:45.80 –  Memories of Silver  (1996)
 miles: 1:43.20 - Graceful Darby (1987)

Margins:
 5 lengths  – Graceful Darby  (1987)

Most wins by an owner
 2 – Henryk de Kwiatkowski (1985, 1986)
 2 – Darby Dan Farm (1988, 1990)
 2 – Stronach Stables (1999, 2000)

Most wins by a jockey
 5 – John R. Velazquez (1995, 2008, 2014, 2016, 2019)

Most wins by a trainer
 5 – Chad C. Brown (2012, 2018, 2019, 2021, 2022)

Winners

Legend:

See also 
 List of American and Canadian Graded races

External links
 Ten Things You Should Know about the QEII Challenge Cup at Hello Race Fans!

References

Graded stakes races in the United States
Grade 1 stakes races in the United States
Flat horse races for three-year-old fillies
Grade 1 turf stakes races in the United States
Keeneland horse races
Recurring sporting events established in 1984
1984 establishments in Kentucky